Diodora cruciata is a species of sea snail, a marine gastropod mollusk in the family Fissurellidae, the keyhole limpets and slit limpets.

Description
The size of the shell varies between 9 mm and 15 mm.

Distribution
This marine species occurs off the Philippines.

References

External links
 To World Register of Marine Species
 

Fissurellidae
Gastropods described in 1846